This is a listing of all chapters of Blade of the Immortal, organized into the original Japanese volumes published by Kodansha, and the English-language volumes published by Dark Horse Comics. The English-language volumes do not directly correspond to the Japanese ones.



Japanese volume list

English-language volume list

English Deluxe Edition

References 

Blade of the Immortal